Pennington is a civil parish in the South Lakeland District of Cumbria, England. It contains six listed buildings that are recorded in the National Heritage List for England.  All the listed buildings are designated at Grade II, the lowest of the three grades, which is applied to "buildings of national importance and special interest".  The parish contains the village of Pennington, and is otherwise almost completely rural.  The listed buildings consist of a pair of cottages, a sundial, a packhorse bridge, a church, a war memorial, and a set of stocks.


Buildings

References

Citations

Sources

Lists of listed buildings in Cumbria